is a Japanese media franchise created in 2017 by Bushiroad, Nelke Planning and Kinema Citrus. It primarily consists of a series of musicals, debuting between September 22 and 24, 2017 at the AiiA 2.5 Theater Tokyo; a 12-episode anime television series directed by Tomohiro Furukawa which aired between July and September 2018; and two animated films, released on August 7, 2020, and June 4, 2021, which abridged and continued the story of the anime. It has received three manga adaptations, all of which began serialization in January 2018. A smartphone game titled Shōjo Kageki Revue Starlight: Re LIVE, developed by Ateam, launched in October 2018.

Premise
The Revue Starlight franchise includes stage musicals, a musical animated series, musical films, and a mobile game each telling original, interconnected stories about the training, personal lives, and growth of several groups of female performing arts students, who are distinguished from their peers as "Stage Girls" by their exceptional zeal for stage acting, ambition for stardom, and competitive nature. Over multiple school years, the characters are drawn together by these shared qualities despite their greatly different personalities and talents, while also coming into conflict in their pursuit to surpass each other.

The Stage Girls invariably settle their conflicts by performance in an otherworldly underground theatre in the round, where the "brilliance" that embodies their passion for acting empowers them to stage impromptu musical theatre revues without stagehands or audiences. In these revues, the Stage Girls sing seemingly spontaneously composed musical numbers, clash in largely hand-to-hand combat, and may even act out dramas, on an ever-changing set constructed by unmanned stagecraft. Though the Stage Girls are depicted as using real weapons, the battles end harmlessly with the removal of a piece of the opponent's stage costume, and victory is declared by standing at a taped T-mark dubbed "position zero". The franchise portrays the spectacle of these revues both on stage using choreography and stage combat, and in animation.

A talking giraffe, as well as, eventually, other denizens of the underground theatre, preside over the revues, all seeking to witness the unpredictable scenes that will play out on stage each time. The Stage Girls join some of these revues by enticement and others by their own volition, but always to fight for consequential stakes in their theatrical pursuits.

In each revue, the characters perform an original "revue song" in duets and ensembles. The franchise further includes a discography of albums and singles collecting these and other original songs, composed in various show tune styles.

The franchise also chronicles the Stage Girls' backstage exploits during school theatre productions. The plots of these plays, most prominently the fictional play Starlight, are often recounted as a story within a story.

Characters
As the same characters appear in both staged and animated media, each character is performed live by her voice actress in stage shows and concerts.

Seisho Music Academy
The franchise launched in 2017 with a cast made up of nine students from Seisho Music Academy's 99th graduating class, who have since appeared as the main casts of three numbered stage plays, an anime series, two animated films, and several manga. They have also received prominent focus in a mobile game. In addition, they have recorded most of the musical discography of the franchise under the billing of Starlight Kuku Gumi (スタァライト九九組, lit. Starlight 99 Group), and have performed the franchise's music live in three numbered concerts, as well as two orchestral concerts.

Karen is a straightforward and carefree girl. Years ago, after watching a performance of Starlight with Hikari that left them both spellbound, she exchanged a promise with Hikari to one day perform Starlight themselves, which motivated her to pursue theatre to the present day. Despite this, Karen lacked the competitive drive to become a Stage Girl until Hikari's return to Japan, after which she resolved not to yield her desired roles to others. Though her impulsiveness causes trouble for the other Stage Girls, her guileless nature makes them ultimately fond of her. In the revues, she uses a spadroon.

In London, Hikari enrolled in an exclusive theatrical school, cultivating her talent under world-class tutelage for the sake of returning to Japan to perform Starlight with Karen. Reserved and laconic, Hikari is slow to open up to Karen upon arriving at Seisho, and even slower to speak openly to anyone else, making her easily misunderstood. Weak to Karen's overwhelming affection, Hikari sometimes keeps at arm's-length, but privately takes great pains to protect Karen even at her own expense. She habitually leaves her room in disarray, until reined in by Mahiru. She fights using a rope dagger, the blade shrunken down from a full-length sword.

The eldest child of a farming family in rural Hokkaido, Mahiru earned many awards in middle school recognizing her performance and baton twirling talent, and enrolled in Seisho at her grandmother's behest. Exceedingly modest, Mahiru fell into an inferiority complex amidst the assembled talent at Seisho, but became smitten with Karen's radiant demeanour, and found new self-esteem attending to her needs. Mahiru comes to understand that she can find fulfillment in helping everyone, not just Karen. She possesses strong domestic skills and physical strength from family and farm life. She fights using a mace.

Born to a Japanese father and French mother, Claudine acted professionally from a young age and was lauded as a theatrical child prodigy. Entering Seisho, Claudine immediately found herself only second-best next to Maya, dashing her former privileged self-image. Ever since, Claudine has turned her full efforts to measuring up to and surpassing Maya in all endeavours, putting on haughty airs all the while, but she is often frustrated when Maya imperturbably meets her challenges. After working hand-in-hand on stage with Maya, her one-sided rivalry finally becomes a mutual partnership. She fights using a longsword.

Recognized by her peers as the 99th class's top student and even addressed deferentially as "Maya-sama", Maya possesses a superior physique and voice and industrious work ethics, inherited from a prima donna mother and stage actor father and honed over a lifelong stage career. Though cordial with the other Stage Girls, Maya is clear-eyed as to their aptitude and limitations. She noticed Claudine's aspiring rivalry with her from their first meeting, eventually acknowledging Claudine as a rival and partner worthy of mutual respect. Privately, Maya harbours imperious and seething jealousy toward all who threaten her dominance on stage, the product of bitter competition in performances past. She also has a voracious appetite. She fights using a long rapier.

Raised to study hard and excel in academics, Junna discovered her passion for theatre on her own. Against her parents' wishes, she enrolled in Seisho and vowed to not return home until after graduation. Endowed with top scholarship aptitude but little advantage in performing, Junna still pursues her unclear path to stardom, and is preoccupied with overcoming the gap in talent between her and the other Stage Girls. While her fast thinking and reserves of knowledge are useful in friendship and competition alike, she is prone to overthinking. She selects glasses with great care. She fights using a bow and arrow.

The multitalented Nana excels in performance with her tall stature, cooks numerous beloved recipes for the other students, and even helps in backstage work. She is kind and caring to everyone in the 99th class, and often takes photos for posterity.  She is nicknamed "Banana" by Karen due to her name, her distinctive hairstyle, and her love of bananas. As Junna's roommate, Nana often accompanies her. After a year in the acting department, she surprises the class by moving to the stagecraft and playwrighting department in her second year. She fights dual wielding both a katana on her right and a wakizashi on her left.

Growing up with Kaoruko at her family's traditional dance school in Kyoto, Futaba became resigned to coming to the aid of the pampered, unworldly Kaoruko from an early age. Remaining by Kaoruko's side out of admiration for her genuine talent, Futaba even followed Kaoruko in enrolling at Seisho on a whim, arduously training to barely pass her own unplanned admission. At Seisho, Futaba further bought a motorcycle and became licensed solely to carry Kaoruko to and from school. Let down by Kaoruko's lackadaisical track record at Seisho, Futaba begins pursuing her own ambitions to become a star performer, even knowing her roles would be limited by her small stature. She is skilled at stage combat, action scenes, and kendo. She fights using a halberd.

Born into a privileged Kyoto family as the granddaughter of a Japanese dance master, Kaoruko grew up assured of inheriting her family's dance school, and carries herself presumptuously as a master to-be. Trained in not just dance but the classical Japanese arts, Kaoruko is proud of her traditional artistry and has taken her training to heart; however, she has come to rest on her laurels, spurning having to prove herself further at Seisho. Taking Futaba's unconditional help for granted, Kaoruko becomes stuck in a rut of complaining and scheming to get her way before finally understanding her responsibilities to Futaba. While Kaoruko remains selfish and manipulative in some measure, she joins the rest of the Stage Girls in competing and contributing in school and life. She fights using a naginata.

Rinmeikan Girls School
Five students from Rinmeikan Girls School, an institution specializing in traditional theatre of Japan, debuted in 2018 as additional main characters in the mobile game. They have also released one single and performed alongside Starlight Kuku Gumi in their third concert.

Kaoruko's childhood friend who greatly values tradition. She holds a unique fondness for the school and its performance department as her grandmother and mother both graduated from it. With the department facing closure, she fights ardently for its survival. She fights using a tachi.

Although her surname means "silent", she's actually a frequent troublemaker. She isn't a deep thinker but is straightforward and friendly. While she can be clumsy, she is willing to work to become a better stage girl. She was an idol in junior high before her group got disbanded and still aspires to be one. She loves pulling pranks on everyone, especially Fumi. She fights using a Japanese war fan.

A student who transferred from Siegfeld to Rinmeikan under enigmatic circumstances. Fumi is a serious, strong-headed, and determined person. Initially, she refuses to participate in Rinmeikan's Performance Department, but Tamao's kindness and her determination influences her to return to the stage. She works a part-time job at Tamao's family's restaurant to support herself and is obsessed with ponzu. She has a younger sister, Shiori, whom she is fond of but currently estranged from. She fights using a swordbreaker.

Tamao's underclasswoman since junior high. Although she frequently gets nervous and doubts herself, she's training to be a stage girl because of her longtime admiration for Tamao and her desire to have a place where she can express herself. Though she, she is especially proficient in stage fighting. In addition to theater, she practices kendo and is noted to be fairly good at it. She fights using an odachi.

A frequent napper who even brings a pillow to class with her. In spite of her reputation and laid-back personality, she is actually a very smart and hardworking person whose sleepiness during the day comes from her hard work practicing solo until late into the night. However, she doesn't like showing it directly and actively tries to hide how hard she works from others. She dreams of becoming a rakugo storyteller and loves Japanese traditional arts. She fights using kunai.

Frontier School of Arts
Five students from Frontier School of Arts, an unconventional, modern school, debuted in 2018 as additional main characters in the mobile game. They have also released one single and performed alongside Starlight Kuku Gumi in their third concert.

A girl with no background as a stage performer, Aruru is always happy and cheerful, and never lets any sadness get her down, believing a bright attitude makes it easier to improve her performance abilities. She inspires her friends to act to their full potential and sees them as family. Behind her happy personality, however, is a traumatic past - she was abandoned by both her parents at birth and spent her childhood in an orphanage, with a slip of paper her only clue to her identity, until she met Misora and her family's theatre troupe. She is an enthusiastic baker, but her creations are mostly inedible. She fights using two Colt Single Action Army handguns. 

Aruru's childhood friend who balances out her highly upbeat nature. She comes from a stage background, as her parents own a small theatre. Though her parents react with skepticism due to the hardship of the lifestyle, they acceded to her desire to become a stage girl. She has two younger sisters and two older sisters. She also has a huge appetite and often eats a shocking amount of food to keep up her stamina. She's good at basketball and other sports. She's totally unaware of Aruru's past despite being close to her as a child until later stories. She fights using a spear.

She is a year older than Aruru and Misora, yet she appears to be very childish, cute, carefree and energetic girl with passion for rabbits. She's a former model and child actress. She is half-German on her mother's side, although she cannot speak any German. She's very dynamic and dedicated as a stage performer, often working her acrobatic abilities into her scenes. She fights using a hammer.

One of the most talented stage girls at Frontier, she suffered an injury that forced her to withdraw from performing for a few months prior to the start of the story. However, thanks to Aruru and Misora's encouragement, she returns to the stage. She had a strict upbringing due to her wealthy family, which lead her to try to break out of her shell as a high school student and become interested in things like fashion and inexpensive snack foods that she was denied in her youth, but despite her frivolous looks, she is responsible, very serious about working to improve her stage skills, and cares deeply about her friends. She fights using two axes.

Known as an acting genius on the level of Maya, Claudine, and Akira. However, because of her skill, she's often pressured by adults around her to diminish herself in order to let other people shine brighter. Outside of acting, she is a renowned gamer and incredibly fond of computers. Shizuha is very health-conscious and often makes smoothies and drinks for her friends and herself that are very nutritious, but taste awful. She fights using a scythe.

Siegfeld Institute of Music
Five students from Siegfeld Institute of Music, an elite school fostering strong competition, debuted in 2018 as additional main characters in the mobile game. They have also released two singles, performed alongside Starlight Kuku Gumi in their third concert, and starred in a Siegfeld-focused stage play with guest appearances from each other school.

Senior

As Frau Platin, Akira is the leader of the Edels. She is exceptionally talented in many areas in performance, but she can be uncompromising and miss the social dynamics around her, making her come off as blunt and somewhat socially awkward. She has considered Maya Tendō her rival since junior high. She has high standards for her fellow Edels, but she looks out for them and helps guide them to their full potential. She fights using a jousting lance.

Frau Saphir and Akira's close childhood friend. Michiru presents a friendly, energetic, and outgoing personality hiding a calculating interior. Her dream is to create the ultimate stage with Akira at the center, so she is interested in directing and producing in addition to acting. She's very perceptive of other people. She fights using a German greatsword.

Frau Rubin and an exchange student from China who was a famous child actor back home. After watching a performance Akira was in, she was inspired to learn Japanese and enroll at Siegfeld in order to perform by her side. She is outgoing and passionate about everything she does. She enjoys gashapon and fortune telling, though her predictions almost always suggest disaster. She fights using a serpent spear, based on the weapon Three Kingdoms General Zhang Fei wields.

Fumi's younger sister and the new Frau Jade, Shiori was recruited to be an Edel despite still being a middle school student. Shiori is fairly timid around those she doesn't know, but she is kind and has a lot of potential. As a child, Shiori was frail and only started attending school recently out of a desire to become a stage girl. Despite Fumi's distance and mysterious departure, Shiori respects her older sister and wishes to restore their relationship. She fights using a saber.

The elusive and mysterious Frau Perle. Yachiyo often teases the other Edels, provoking anger from the more serious ones like Akira and Mei Fan. She often gets swept up in her imagination. Despite her appearance, Yachiyo is an incredibly skilled stage girl and tailor. Like Michiru, she is very perceptive of people. She fights using a crossbow.

Junior High

A transfer student from the Munich National Academy of Arts in Germany and the maternal granddaughter of the school director Victoria Siegfeld. Her given name is Stella Siegfeld, but she goes by her Japanese grandfather's surname while in Japan. Since her ancestors founded the school, she seeks to protect its traditions, though she tends to act spoiled when surrounded by her friends.

Another transfer student from Germany, Shiro is Stella's childhood friend who also serves as her de facto maid and protector. Quiet and serious, she comes from a family who has served the Siegfelds for generations, and refers to Stella as "ojousama" (young mistress, or Miss Stella).

A low-achieving student who enrolled in the school as an alternate, she suffers from low self-confidence and is strained by the competitive nature of her classmates. Despite this, she is determined to overcome the difficulties in order to provide for her large family at home.

A student who possesses natural abilities as a stage performer, but has a freewheeling attitude that prevents her from getting good grades. She is currently trying to figure out her stage girl status.

The president of Stella's class and a hardworking, serious student who aims to follow Akira's footstep.

Seiran General Arts Institute
Three students from Seiran General Arts Institute debuted in 2018 in the franchise's second numbered stage play, before being added to the mobile game as additional main characters. They have also released one single, starred in a Seiran-focused stage play, and played central roles in Siegfeld's stage play.

The “genius of Seiran,” a stage girl whose reputation and capabilities are acknowledged even by Maya Tendō.

A stage girl who attended the same middle school as Seisho’s Mahiru Tsuyuzaki. Suzu was the ace of the cheerleading squad just as Mahiru was the ace of the baton twirling team. Inspired by Mahiru's skills at a baton twirling meet, she requested to incorporate baton twirling into cheerleading routines. Her dream is to stand on the same stage as Mahiru and see the view from it together with her.

A stage girl who attended the same middle school as Seisho’s Nana Daiba. She has a beautiful singing voice and was part of the chorus club in middle school. She wanted to put on a play with Nana, but she felt that she was not good enough and didn't show up at the performance so that she wouldn't bring down Nana.

Seiran's club teacher.

Other

The sole occupant of the underground theatre, for the most part, is a giraffe who officiates over revues. Normal in appearance, the giraffe speaks human languages and can contact Stage Girls by a mobile app with a distinctive ringtone. Though he is never seen outside the theatre, he is able to know the Stage Girls' activities and thoughts. In stage plays, the giraffe appears as an offstage voice only.

In the Re LIVE mobile game, a young woman known only as Elle joins the giraffe, summoning Stage Girls of multiple schools to the theatre. Unlike the giraffe's revues, Elle's revues – as well as Elle herself – are products of the imagination of a five-year-old child, given form through her fledgling playwriting efforts inspired by the Stage Girls' performances. Though Elle of the theatre cannot speak to the real Elle, the Stage Girls find the real Elle and help to nurture her writing.

Media

Stage plays
The series began as a stage play performed at the AiiA 2.5 Theater in Tokyo. The first performances, titled Shōjo☆Kageki Revue Starlight: The LIVE #1 were held from September 22 to 24, 2017, and a re-run titled Shōjo☆Kageki Revue Starlight: The LIVE #1 revival took place from January 6 to 8, 2018. A sequel stage play, titled Shōjo☆Kageki Revue Starlight: The LIVE #2 Transition, was performed at the Galaxy Theater in Shinagawa from October 13 to 21, 2018, with a re-run titled Shōjo☆Kageki Revue Starlight: The LIVE #2 Revival performed at the Maihama Amphitheater in Chiba from July 12 to 15, 2019. A third stage play, titled Shōjo☆Kageki Revue Starlight: The LIVE #3 Growth, was performed at Shinagawa Prince Hotel Stellar Ball in Shinagawa from July 27 to August 1, 2021. The play was originally meant to be performed in July 2020, but was postponed due to the COVID-19 pandemic, and an online prequel stage play, titled Shōjo☆Kageki Revue Starlight: The LIVE ONLINE, was held in its place. A fourth stage play will be held in February 2023 at Tokyo Tatemono Brilla Hall.

A stage play focusing on the students of Seiran General Art Institute and a spin-off of The LIVE #2 Transition, titled Shōjo☆Kageki Revue Starlight: The LIVE Seiran BLUE GLITTER, was performed at the Galaxy Theater in Shinagawa from December 21 to 27, 2020.

A stage play based on the Shōjo☆Kageki Revue Starlight: Re LIVE game and focusing on the Edels and Junior High students of Siegfeld Institute of Music, titled Shōjo☆Kageki Revue Starlight: The LIVE Edel Delight, was performed at the Galaxy Theater in Shinagawa from February 18 to 27, 2022. A spin-off stage play focusing on the Junior High students of said school, titled Shōjo☆Kageki Revue Starlight: The STAGE Junior High Regalia, was held at the Hikosen Theater in Taito from October 14 to 24, 2022.

Manga
A manga adaptation of the musical drawn by Tsubaki Ayasugi, titled , and a 4-panel manga series by Makimaki Mawaru, both began serialization in Bushiroad's Monthly Bushiroad magazine from January 6, 2018. A third manga written by Kanata Nakamura and illustrated by Sora Goto, began serialization in ASCII Media Works' Dengeki G's Comic magazine from January 30, 2018.

Anime
A 12-episode anime television series produced by Bushiroad, Tokyo Broadcasting System Television, Pony Canyon, Overlap, Nelke Planning and Kinema Citrus aired in Japan between July 12 and September 27, 2018. The series was directed by Tomohiro Furukawa, with Tatsuto Higuchi handling series composition and writing the scripts, Hiroyuki Saita designing the characters and Yoshiaki Fujisawa and Tatsuya Kato composing the score. In addition, most episodes feature musical numbers by various composers, with lyrics by Kanata Nakamura. The series was released on three Blu-ray Disc/DVD volumes, each containing additional original video animation shorts, between October 24, 2018, and February 27, 2019. Sentai Filmworks has licensed the anime and is streaming the series on Hidive with English, Portuguese and Spanish subtitles, and is also dubbed in English. MVM Entertainment acquired the distribution rights for the UK and Ireland via Sentai Filmworks. A spin-off comedy series, titled , was announced on March 31, 2019.

{|class="wikitable" style="width:100%; margin:auto; background:#FFF;"
|- style="border-bottom: 3px solid #CCF;"
! style="width:4em;"  | 
! Title
! Directed by
! Original air date
|-

{{Episode list
| EpisodeNumber   = 8
| Title           = Toward the Light
| TranslitTitle   = Hikari, sasu hō e
| NativeTitle     = ひかり、さす方へ
| NativeTitleLangCode = ja
| DirectedBy      = Fumiaki Kōta
| OriginalAirDate = 
| ShortSummary    = While studying in London, Hikari diligently worked to fulfill her promise with Karen, but was tempted by the giraffe into an audition where she ultimately lost to a fellow classmate. Afterwards, Hikari realised that the intangible "brilliance" that propelled her stage performances had been taken to fuel the winner's Top Star role. Fearful of forsaking her promise, Hikari accepted a second chance to compete in the auditions in Japan.
In the present, Hikari struggles to battle Nana with a much-diminished blade (Revue of Solitude, Revue Song: "RE:CREATE"), but overcomes this handicap, drawing on her remaining brilliance to augment the weapon's form and function. Even so, Hikari remains haunted by the dilemma that her promise with Karen would be broken if either of them lost. Defeated, Nana warns Hikari that she cannot avert the tragic parting written into Starlight'''s ending.
}}

|}

Films
On November 3, 2019, during the "Revue Starlight 3rd StarLive 'Starry Diamond'" concert, it was announced that the series would receive two new films. The first is a compilation film titled Rondo Rondo Rondo that was slated to premiere on May 29, 2020, but was delayed to August 7, 2020, due to the COVID-19 pandemic. The second is a brand-new anime film, entitled after the series itself, was planned to premiere on May 21, 2021, but was delayed to June 4, 2021, due to the COVID-19 pandemic and the extension of Japan's state of emergency period.

Revue Starlight: Rondo Rondo RondoRondo Rondo Rondo is an abridged theatrical presentation of previously broadcast content from the anime series, re-edited and expanded with a few new scenes. Many dialogue scenes are removed, and several of the revue scenes segue directly into each other. Dialogues between Nana and the giraffe are added, commenting on the audition and the surrounding events.

All songs from the series appear in the film, some with new musical arrangements, except "-Star Divine- finale" and "Fly Me to the Star". The former is replaced with "Star Diamond", while the new song "Hymn to Rebirth" plays over the end credits. "The Star Knows" and "Pride and Arrogance" exchange order of appearance.

Before the end credits, Nana, in the underground theatre, notices the red star props suspended overhead as a portent of death. After the end credits, the fallen Tokyo Tower is seen in the underground theatre, and the sound of an oncoming train is heard.

Revue Starlight the MovieRevue Starlight the Movie (Gekijōban Shōjo☆Kageki Revyū Sutāraito) is a sequel film continuing from the ending shared by the anime and Rondo Rondo Rondo. The film includes 50 minutes of musical sequences featuring six new revue songs, as well as the new end credits song "私たちはもう舞台の上" (Watashitachi wa Mō Butai no Ue).

Having performed Starlight together, Hikari defeats Karen in a chaotic revue. Both the Starlight tower and Tokyo Tower fall to cataclysmic ruin in a desert as Hikari declares their parting.

As they enter their graduating year, all but a few of the Stage Girls of Seisho's 99th class intend to apply to the top national theatrical troupe. Karen, mourning Hikari's return to London, is without future plans.

On their way to visit the troupe, the Stage Girls are waylaid in a surprise revue when their subway train and the city landscape transform into a stage. Detached and without exertion, Nana dispatches nearly everyone, posing cryptic questions about their future that only Maya seems to comprehend ("wi(l)d-screen baroque"), and leaving them playing out a graphic tableau of death.

After receiving the unfinished Starlight script for their graduating performance, featuring new lines calling for change and rebirth, the Stage Girls arrive at understandings of Nana's exhortations. On another train, the giraffe, appearing in the form of vegetables, drops tomatoes which each of the Stage Girls bites into.

Karen, oblivious to all this, is left alone in a solitary train car heading through a vast desert to Tokyo Tower. In extended flashbacks, Karen's childhood since meeting Hikari is shown: once shy and withdrawn, Karen became outgoing and found her love for the stage with Hikari's encouragement. Receiving from Hikari a Starlight poster folded as an envelope, Karen kept the envelope as a lifelong possession. Even over years of theatre training to reunite with Hikari on the stage, however, Karen repeatedly shrank from learning about Hikari's activities.

In the underground theatre, Kaoruko, as a bakuto, deals a game of chō-han at an illicit gambling den in a Shinto shrine complex. She faces off against Futaba, as a sukajan-clad delinquent, as both crash dekotora trucks through the walls (Revue of Malice, "わがままハイウェー"Wagamama Highway). Squabbling over Kaoruko's resentment for refusing to return to Kyoto together, Futaba offers rationalizations but cannot face Kaoruko when the scene changes to a seductive cabaret club. Atop high scaffolding, they mount opposing trucks and race head-on with weapons drawn, only to fall off together. In resignation, Kaoruko acquiesces to Futaba's victory and receives Futaba's motorcycle as a gift.

Spurred by the giraffe to search for Karen, Hikari boards a London Underground train, arriving beneath the underground theatre. Hikari finds instead Mahiru opening a multi-sport event in a track and field stadium. Forced halfheartedly into a revue that instantaneously morphs into a variety of sport competitions (Revue of Competition, "MEDAL SUZDAL PANIC◎〇●"), Hikari is defeated by Mahiru, then further menaced in a frightening pursuit through the deserted backstage. Browbeaten into tearful contrition for leaving Karen, Hikari is solaced by a once-more encouraging Mahiru in a medal ceremony and is sent on her way.

Nana coldly scorns Junna's retreat from performance to study theatre in university, offering a blade as if to prompt seppuku. After futilely attempting to ensnare Nana in a labyrinth paved in famous quotations while raining down arrows and copies of the character 星 (hoshi, lit. star), Junna, reduced to tears by Nana's contempt, claims Nana's blade as her own and fights back, renouncing the quotations for words of her own (Revue of Hunting, "ペン : 力 : 刀", Pen:Chikara:Katana). Battling obstinately through spotlit haze, Junna steps onto an unseen position zero and defeats Nana through her shocked denial. They reconcile and part without looking back.

Confronted by Hikari on a train platform high above the clouds, the giraffe drops a tomato before bursting into flame and falling to the desert far below.

Maya and Claudine perform a play on the stage of a conventional, empty theatre (Revue of Souls, "美しき人　或いは其れは", Utsukushiki Hito Arui wa Sore wa). The Devil in human guise (Claudine) wagers for the soul of a stage performer (Maya) by the signature of a contract. They trick each other, in turn, with artifices as the Devil seeks to take the performer's soul in return for a display of brilliance. Discarding their roles, they goad each other into a frenzied, passionate duel across a web of aerial pathways and platforms. Claudine defeats Maya, fulfilling the contract as the stage set burns down in a towering conflagration. Holding hands, they commit once more to their rivalry to come.

Arriving on Tokyo Tower, Karen finds Hikari with a half-eaten tomato. Still speaking of only Hikari, Karen is unnerved by suddenly seeing the stage and the audience anew. Denied of another stage with Hikari, Karen falls dead as an uneaten tomato explodes. Weeping, Hikari confesses to running from her own admiration of Karen.

Hikari drops her envelope and Karen's body through a chute, beckoning Karen to return. A position zero-shaped metal box with Karen's face lands on a rail car, which carries the box through a fierce sandstorm by igniting rocket engines and launching off a ramp. The rocket exhaust incinerates, in its wake, Hikari's envelope and scenes of Karen's past life. A reborn Karen emerges from the box in front of Hikari, and both are paraded in ostentatious displays of stage lighting (The Final Lines, "スーパー スタァ スペクタクル", Super Star Spectacle).

Hikari's radiance, visible for miles, awes Karen and snaps her sword in two. Both thrust their weapons, and Hikari stabs Karen squarely in the chest. A geyser of position zero-shaped boxes erupts forth from Karen, tearing Tokyo Tower in two. The tower's upended tip plants into a vast position zero swathed across the desert. The Stage Girls, including the others watching from afar, cast away their pelisses as the revue ends. Unharmed, Karen looks forward to her next stage as Hikari gives her a tomato.

Over the end credits, Hikari encounters the Stage Girls at their new professions and studies across the world. Karen is seen at an unspecified audition, her destination unrevealed.

Video games
A smartphone game titled Shōjo Kageki Revue Starlight -Re LIVE- developed by Ateam and Bushiroad was released for Android devices on October 22, 2018, and an iOS version was released on October 28. The game features gacha gameplay elements. A worldwide version of the game, localized into English, Korean, and Traditional Chinese, was released on April 22, 2019.

In the game, players collect Stage Girls performing a variety of roles from literature, history, mythology, legends, and original stories, then build parties to challenge a growing variety of single-player and multi-player activities, most featuring leaderboards. Players can select songs from across the franchise to use as revue songs during battles.

The game story, continuing after the end of the auditions in the anime series, introduces the Seisho Stage Girls to the Rinmeikan, Frontier, and Siegfeld Stage Girls in new revues in the underground theatre, as their four schools prepare to participate in the Performance Festival, a high-profile event.

At first, the Stage Girls battle collectively against forces causing Starlight, as well as other plays treasured by each school, to be forgotten by the general public. They then discover that these battles were manifestations of the writings of a five-year-old girl, Elle, who wishes to witness the Stage Girls perform those plays. The Stage Girls decide to continue to perform Elle's stories in revues.

In late 2019, after the game cast performed the real-life "Starry Diamond" concert, including six original revue songs by mixed ensembles between the four schools, the game launched stories, events, and characters depicting the Stage Girls competing in a series of Greek mythology and constellation-themed revues using these songs. However, the Starry Diamond story did not continue past its first two parts.

The next phase of the story, Arcada Arcadia, is written by Tatsuto Higuchi, the scriptwriter of the anime series, and remains ongoing. In Arcana Arcadia, the Stage Girls return to the underground theatre, performing in a new audition to inspire a future play yet to be written by Elle, and to compete for the yet-unknown leading role. At the same time, the Stage Girls are all cast in an original ensemble cast play for the Performance Festival, performing roles based on the Major Arcana, and become driven to outperform each other despite the lack of a leading role. Each part of the story debuted an original revue song.

The game also launched time-limited cross-promotional events for franchises including Hatsune Miku, BanG Dream!, Love Live! Sunshine!!, Symphogear, Steins;Gate, Pacific League baseball, and Sakura Wars''. Crossover characters from the Sakura Wars franchise were added to the game as playable Stage Girls.

A visual novel based on the series was announced in January 2023 and is currently in development by Frontwing. It is set to be released in Japan in 2023 for Nintendo Switch and Windows.

Note

References

External links
 
 

2.5D musicals
2020s musical films
Animated films about trains
Animated films set in London
Animated films set in Tokyo
Animated musical films
Backstage musicals
Bushiroad
Dengeki G's Magazine
Fictional giraffes
Films about actors
Films about competitions
Films about musical theatre
Films about wish fulfillment
Films set in a theatre
Films set in deserts
Films set in subterranea
Films set on the London Underground
Gacha games
Japanese musical films
Kinema Citrus
Music in anime and manga
Musicals based on anime and manga
Plays about actors
Seinen manga
Sentai Filmworks
Shōnen manga
Stage play franchises
Television series about actors
Theatre in anime and manga
Works about performing arts education
Works about plays
Works about playwrighting
Anime postponed due to the COVID-19 pandemic
Films postponed due to the COVID-19 pandemic